The Roman Catholic Diocese of Palmares is a diocese located in the city of Palmares in the Ecclesiastical province of Olinda e Recife in Brazil.

History
 1962.01.13: Established as Diocese of Palmares from the Diocese of Garanhuns and Metropolitan Archdiocese of Olinda e Recife

Bishops
 Bishops of Palmares (Latin Church)
 Acácio Rodrigues Alves (July 11, 1962 – July 12, 2000)
 Genival Saraiva de França (July 12, 2000 – March 19, 2014)
 Henrique Soares da Costa (March 19, 2014 - July 18, 2020)

Coadjutor bishop
José Doth de Oliveira (1989-1991), did not succeed to see; appointed Coadjutor Bishop of Iguatú, Ceara

External links 
 Official website

References
 GCatholic.org
 Catholic Hierarchy

Roman Catholic dioceses in Brazil
Christian organizations established in 1962
Palmares, Roman Catholic Diocese of
Roman Catholic dioceses and prelatures established in the 20th century